Cyclocranium is a genus of beetles in the long-horned beetle family and the tribe Pseudocephalini. It contains a single species, Cyclocranium swierstrae. 

They are most commonly found in Australia. Their diet consists of Eucalyptus grandis.

References 

Cerambycinae
Monotypic Cerambycidae genera